Arna Ýr Jónsdóttir (born 30 May 1995) is an Icelandic model, beauty pageant titleholder, and pole vaulter. She was crowned Miss Iceland 2015, and represented her country at Miss World 2015. Arna later won Miss Universe Iceland 2017 and represented Iceland at Miss Universe 2017.

Arna made international headlines in 2016, after withdrawing from Miss Grand International 2016, where she was set to represent Iceland, because of pageant organizers asking her to lose weight.

Life and career

Athletics
Arna is a track and field athlete specialising in the pole vault. She has won the Icelandic women's championship, and won the bronze medal at the 2014 European Team Championships in Tbilisi.

Pageantry
Arna received her first national title after being crowned Miss Iceland 2015 in September 2015. In June 2016, she won the Miss Euro pageant. She went on to represent Iceland at Miss World 2015, where she was unplaced. Arna Ýr was later set to represent Iceland at Miss Grand International 2016, but withdrew after being told by pageant organizers that she needed to lose weight. Following her withdrawal, the story was reported on by several international news outlets, such as CNN and The Independent. Afterwards, Nike hired her as a brand representative. In 2017, Arna won Miss Universe Iceland 2017, and represented Iceland at Miss Universe 2017. Her reign ended after crowning Katrín Lea Elenudóttir as Miss Universe Iceland 2018 in August 2018.

Achievements

Personal life
Arna gave birth to her first child with partner Vignir Þór Bollason in 2019.

References

External links

1995 births
Arna Yr Jonsdottir
Arna Yr Jonsdottir
Arna Yr Jonsdottir
Living people
Arna Yr Jonsdottir
Miss Universe 2017 contestants
Miss World 2015 delegates
Arna Yr Jonsdottir